Alogliptin, sold under the brand names Nesina and Vipidia,) is an oral anti-diabetic drug in the DPP-4 inhibitor (gliptin) class. Alogliptin does not decrease the risk of heart attack and stroke. Like other members of the gliptin class, it causes little or no weight gain, exhibits relatively little risk of hypoglycemia, and has relatively modest glucose-lowering activity. Alogliptin and other gliptins are commonly used in combination with metformin in people whose diabetes cannot adequately be controlled with metformin alone.

In April 2016, the U.S. Food and Drug Administration (FDA) added a warning about increased risk of heart failure. It was developed by Syrrx, a company which was acquired by Takeda Pharmaceutical Company in 2005. In 2020, it was the 295th most commonly prescribed medication in the United States, with more than 1million prescriptions.

Medical uses
Alogliptin is a dipeptidyl peptidase-4 inhibitor that decreases blood sugar similar to the other.

Side effects
Adverse events include mild hypoglycemia based on clinical studies. Alogliptin is not associated with increased weight, increased risk of cardiovascular events. It may also cause joint pain that can be severe and disabling. In April 2016, the U.S. Food and Drug Administration (FDA) added a warning about increased risk of heart failure.

Market access

In December 2007, Takeda submitted a New Drug Application (NDA) for alogliptin to the United States Food and Drug Administration (USFDA), after positive results from Phase III clinical trials.  In September 2008, the company also filed for approval in Japan, winning approval in April 2010.  The company also filed a Marketing Authorization Application (MAA) elsewhere outside the United States, which was withdrawn in June 2009 needing more data.  The first USFDA NDA failed to gain approval and was followed by a pair of NDAs (one for alogliptin and a second for a combination of alogliptin and pioglitazone) in July 2011.  In 2012, Takeda received a negative response from the USFDA on both of these NDAs, citing a need for additional data.

In 2013, the FDA approved the drug in three formulations: as a stand-alone with the brand-name Nesina, combined with metformin using the name Kazano, and when combined with pioglitazone as Oseni.

References

External links
 
 

Dipeptidyl peptidase-4 inhibitors
Nitriles
Piperidines
Ureas
Imides
Pyrimidinediones
Enantiopure drugs
Takeda Pharmaceutical Company brands
Sanofi